Harry Hobbs is an Australian lawyer and legal academic who specialises in Australian constitutional law. An associate professor at the Faculty of Law of the University of Technology Sydney, Hobbs has published numerous works regarding the legal rights of Aboriginal Australians within Australia, micronations, and secessionism in Australia. He has collaborated with lawyer George Williams on several occasions.

Bibliography

References

Living people
Year of birth missing (living people)